George Hutchinson may refer to:
 George Hutchinson (Australian rules footballer) (1874–1946), Australian footballer for Fitzroy in 1902
 George Hutchinson (English footballer) (1929–1996), English football (soccer) player
 George Hutchinson (politician) (1844–1923), Australian politician
 George B. Hutchinson (born 1973), American scholar and Professor of Literary Studies at Indiana University
 George R. Hutchinson (1902–1989), American aviator
 George Hutchinson (Jack the Ripper suspect), a suspect in the Jack the Ripper case
 G. Evelyn Hutchinson (1903–1991), Anglo-American zoologist
 George Wylie Hutchinson, painter and illustrator

See also 
 George Hutchison (disambiguation)